The Yorba Linda Open Invitational was a golf tournament on the PGA Tour that played only one time, January 15–18, 1960 at the Yorba Linda Country Club in Yorba Linda, California. The 6,834-yard, par-71 course was designed by David and Harry Rainville and opened in 1957.

The event was won by 43-year-old Jerry Barber by one stroke over Billy Maxwell.

Winners

References

Former PGA Tour events
Golf in California
1960 establishments in California
1960 disestablishments in California